Chromulina elegans is a species of golden algae in the family Chromulinaceae. It is found in freshwater, in Europe, South America and Asia.

References

External links 
 
 Chromulina elegans at AlgaeBase

Chrysophyceae
Species described in 1923